Dendroseris litoralis, the cabbage tree, is a small evergreen tree species belonging to the daisy and sunflower family Asteraceae. It is found only on the Juan Fernández Islands, west of Chile, and is threatened by habitat loss.  It is native only to tiny, volcanic Robinson Crusoe Island, one of the Juan Fernández Islands in the southeast Pacific, far off the coast of Chile, and home of the famed Juania australis and many other endemic plants. This strange, small tree has been brought back from the brink of extinction. It had been reduced to only a few individuals by feral goats on the island, and is still considered critically endangered.

Description
It grows into a small, gnarled tree with several somewhat palm-like crowns of very large, ovate leaves on whitish, green-spotted leaf stalks and pendent inflorescences of bright orange, tassel-like 'flowers' (capitula). It is easy to cultivate and enjoys a cool, humid climate. It is hardy to light freezes and California coastal conditions.

Etymology
The generic name Dendroseris is a compound of the Greek elements δενδρον (dendron) 'tree' and σέρις (seris), meaning a type of endive and later, by extension, any type of potherb. The literal meaning ('the tree that yields a potherb') is thus very close to the English common name: cabbage tree. The Latin specific name litoralis signifies 'growing by the (sea) shore'. The binomial, in its entirety, thus means (approximately) 'the tree-cabbage that grows by the seashore'.
Endives (genus Cichorium) belong to the same tribe (Cichorieae) of the daisy family Asteraceae as the genus Dendroseris.

Edibility
The very large leaves are edible and formed part of the diet of voluntary castaway Alexander Selkirk - possible inspiration for Daniel Defoe's character Robinson Crusoe - during his sojourn on one of the Juan Fernandez Islands.

Hummingbird pollination
In their recent studies Anderson et al. (2001) studied the reproductive biology of D. litoralis. They concluded that the large orange corolla capitula of D. litoralis were hummingbird pollinated, having observed hummingbird visitors on all plants observed. The same team also determined in 2000 that the nectar composition of Dendroseris litoralis has large quantities of sucrose (73%), 15% fructose and 10.9% glucose (Bernardello et al. 2000).

Gallery

References

External links

 The Cabbage Tree - Dendroseris litoralis
 Royal Botanic Gardens: Dendroseris litoralis

Critically endangered plants
litoralis
Endemic flora of the Juan Fernández Islands
Flora of Chile
Robinson Crusoe Island
Taxonomy articles created by Polbot